Howard James Hubbard (born October 31, 1938) is an American prelate of the Roman Catholic Church who served as bishop of the Diocese of Albany in New York from 1977 to 2014.

Biography

Early life 
Howard Hubbard was born on October 31, 1938, in Troy, New York, to Howard and Elizabeth Hubbard. He attended St. Patrick's School and La Salle Institute in Troy, entering Mater Christi Seminary in 1956. He furthered his studies at St. Joseph's Seminary in Yonkers, New York, obtaining a Bachelor of Philosophy degree.  He then attended the Pontifical Gregorian University in Rome.

Priesthood 
While in Rome, Hubbard was ordained to the priesthood for the Diocese of Albany by Archbishop Martin John O'Connor on December 18, 1963. He engaged in graduate study in the field of social services at the Catholic University of America in Washington, D.C. 

After his ordination, Hubbard served as associate pastor of St. Joseph's Parish in Schenectady, New York, and at the Cathedral of the Immaculate Conception Parish in Albany, New York. Hubbard also founded Hope House (a drug rehabilitation center) and Providence House (a crisis intervention center) and served as a "street priest" in Albany's South End. He served as vicar general of the diocese from 1976 to 1977.

Bishop of Albany 
On February 2, 1977, Hubbard was appointed bishop of the Diocese of Albany by Pope Paul VI. He received his episcopal consecration on March 27, 1977. He was the youngest bishop in the country at the time, and was dubbed "the boy bishop."

Hubbard served as chairman of the U.S. Conference of Catholic Bishops (USCCB) Committee for International Justice and Peace and on the Subcommittees on the Catholic Campaign for Human Development and the Church in Africa. He also served on other national bishops’ committees, including the Committees on Human Values, Marriage and the Family, Communication, Laity and North American College. 

Hubbard was appointed by Pope John Paul II to the Vatican's Secretariat for Non-Christians (later known as the Pontifical Council for Interreligious Dialogue). He is a supporter of the ecumenical movement, serving as Roman Catholic Co-chair of the Oriental Orthodox-Roman Catholic Consultation. Under his leadership as bishop, the  Diocese of Albany maintained an active Catholic-Jewish dialogue.

During his tenure as bishop, Hubbard presided over a nearly $20 million renovation project at the Cathedral of the Immaculate Conception. He also led a parish consolidation process—known as "Called to BE Church"—that resulted in the closing of 33 parishes.

Hubbard had a reputation as a liberal bishop. He was known for progressive views on drug addiction and the prison population, and for advocacy of sometimes unpopular social justice issues. He is also noted for his anti-poverty efforts. Upon becoming bishop, Hubbard sold a large bishop's residence where previous bishops had lived with a domestic staff.  He also dispensed with having a car and a driver. In 1992, he began living "in almost monastic simplicity in a nondescript, squat brick building" across the street from the Cathedral of the Immaculate Conception. As of 2013, Hubbard reportedly collected an annual salary of $33,508, the same salary as any diocesan priest with a similar number of years of service. Hubbard once sued to prevent clinics providing abortion services to women from opening in Albany and Hudson, New York. He headed New Yorkers Against the Death Penalty, a group opposing capital punishment.

Sexual misconduct

Allegations against Hubbard 
In February 2004, Hubbard was accused of having engaged in homosexual activity with two different men in the 1970s. Hubbard denied both accusations and asserted that he had never broken his vow of celibacy. The diocese hired former U.S. Attorney Mary Jo White to investigate them. In June 2004, White released a 200-page report stating that she had found no credible evidence to support the accusations against Hubbard. White said she found "no evidence that Hubbard 'led a homosexual lifestyle, engaged in homosexual relations or visited gay bars'". White indicated that her investigative team had reviewed more than 20,000 documents and conducted over 300 interviews in connection with the Hubbard investigation.

On August 14, 2019, a man filed a civil lawsuit accusing Hubbard of sexually abusing the plaintiff when he was a teenaged boy in the 1990's. On August 16, 2019, Hubbard responded, "'With full and complete confidence, I can say this allegation is false. I have never sexually abused anyone in my life. I have trust in the canonical and civil legal processes and believe my name will be cleared in due course.'" Hubbard also announced that he was taking a voluntary leave of absence from public ministry until the matter was resolved. On September 16, 2019, an unnamed woman alleged that Hubbard and two other priests sexually abused her in the rectory of Immaculate Conception Church in Schenectady in the late 1970s when she was a teenager. Hubbard denied this accusation as well.

On August 12, 2020, a South Carolina resident accused Hubbard of child sex abuse in a lawsuit filed with the New York Supreme Court. The plaintiff alleged that Hubbard sexually abused him when he was ten years old on a 1975 field trip to West Point.  The assault allegedly happened on an empty church bus. The plaintiff said that when he started feeling ill at West Point, Hubbard escorted him back to the bus to rest.  Hubbard denied the charges.

Sexual abuse claims
In 2004, the Diocese of Albany reported that 19 priests had credible accusations of sexual abuse against minors over the past 53 years, and that investigations were pending into allegations involving ten current and former priests. That same year, the diocese created the Independent Mediation Assistance Program to financially assist victims. On March 19, 2011, Hubbard placed three retired priests on administrative leave and removed another from the ministry after receiving allegations of child sexual abuse. Hubbard apologized in 2013 for shortcomings by him and the diocese in responding to the sexual abuse crisis.

Retirement and legacy
Hubbard submitted his required letter of resignation to Pope Francis on October 31, 2013, when he reached the age of 75. On February 11, 2014, the Vatican announced that Pope Francis had accepted Hubbard's resignation and appointed as his successor, Bishop Edward Scharfenberger. Hubbard suffered a heart attack in July 2015 

In a July 2021 interview to the Albany Times Union, Hubbard admitted that the diocese used to send priests accused of sexually abusing minor away for treatment without notifying the police.  He expressed regret over this practice.  Hubbard continued to deny all sexual abuse allegations directed at him personally.

In a 2021 legal deposition, he acknowledged covering up allegations of sexual abuse against children by priests.  One of the reasons was to avoid scandal and protect the reputation of the diocese. Hubbard named several accused priests who were returned to ministry after treatment, without notification to the public. Records of the allegations were kept locked away, accessible only to top church officials. He was asked in the deposition "“Bishop, why didn’t you, after he admitted to you having committed the felony of child sexual abuse, at his lips to your ears, why didn’t you call up the police and say, ‘I have a priest that just admitted a crime to me’?” Hubbard’s answer: “Because I was not a mandated reporter. I don’t think the law then or even now requires me to do it.”. The diocese did not comment on the content of Hubbard's testimony.

Hubbard suffered a stroke in July 2022.

In November 2022, Hubbard petitioned the Holy See to remove him from the clerical state, while maintaining his innocence against sexual abuse allegations. Hubbard said he requested laicization because he was already unable to function as a priest due to the diocese's policy of barring any clergy with active investigations from public ministry, though the diocese said that was not policy and that Hubbard had removed himself from active ministry. One publication reported that Hubbard has requested the dispensation so that he would be free to marry.

References

External links
Diocese of Albany

Episcopal succession

1938 births
Living people
Roman Catholic bishops of Albany
People from Troy, New York
Pontifical Gregorian University alumni
Pontifical North American College alumni
Saint Joseph's Seminary (Dunwoodie) alumni
Catholic University of America alumni
Ecclesiastical passivity to Catholic sexual abuse cases
21st-century Roman Catholic bishops in the United States
20th-century Roman Catholic bishops in the United States
Catholic Church sexual abuse scandals in the United States